Mushtaq Ahmad (born 15 February 1956) is a former field hockey forward from Pakistan. He won the gold medal in 1984 Summer Olympics.

See also
Mushtaq Ahmad (field hockey, born 1932)

References

External links
 

Living people
1956 births
Pakistani male field hockey players
Medalists at the 1984 Summer Olympics
Olympic gold medalists for Pakistan
Asian Games gold medalists for Pakistan
Medalists at the 1982 Asian Games
Asian Games medalists in field hockey
Field hockey players at the 1982 Asian Games
Field hockey players at the 1984 Summer Olympics
Olympic medalists in field hockey
20th-century Pakistani people